The Gabon beaked snake (Letheobia caeca) is a species of blind snake in the family Typhlopidae. It is endemic to Sub-Saharan Africa. It is known from Gabon (its type locality), Cameroon, the Republic of the Congo, the Democratic Republic of the Congo, and Ghana. However, the identity of different populations is not fully clear.

References

Further reading
Duméril, A.H.A. 1856. Note sur les reptiles du Gabon. Revue et Magasin de Zoologie Pure et Apliquée, Paris, Series 2, Volume 8, pp. 369–377, 417–424, 460–470, 553–562. (Onychocephalus cæcus, p. 462)
 Abstract

Letheobia
Snakes of Africa
Reptiles of West Africa
Reptiles of Cameroon
Reptiles of the Democratic Republic of the Congo
Reptiles of Gabon
Fauna of Ghana
Reptiles of the Republic of the Congo
Taxa named by Auguste Duméril
Reptiles described in 1856